Robert John Colville (born 1965) is a United States district judge of the United States District Court for the Western District of Pennsylvania

Biography
Colville grew up on the North Side of Pittsburgh and was the middle of three children of Robert E. and Judy Joyce Colville. Colville received a Bachelor of Arts from Pennsylvania State University in 1989  and his Juris Doctor from Duquesne University School of Law in 1992.  He began his legal career by serving as a law clerk from 1992 to 1994 to the Honorable Ralph J. Cappy, Chief Justice of the Supreme Court of Pennsylvania. He worked as an associate at the law firm of Pietragallo Bosick & Gordon in Pittsburgh, Pennsylvania from 1994 to 1999. From 2000 to 2019, Colville served as a judge on the Court of Common Pleas for Allegheny County, where he presided over civil matters. From 2012 to 2019, he served as a judge on the Pennsylvania Court of Judicial Discipline.

Federal judicial service

Expired nomination to district court under Obama 
On July 30, 2015, President Obama nominated Colville to serve as a United States district judge of the United States District Court for the Western District of Pennsylvania, to the seat vacated by Judge Gary L. Lancaster, who died on April 24, 2013. He received a hearing before the Senate Judiciary Committee on December 9, 2015. His nomination expired on January 3, 2017, with the end of the 114th Congress.

Renomination to district court under Trump 

On March 1, 2019, President Donald Trump announced his intent to nominate Colville to serve as a United States district judge for the United States District Court for the Western District of Pennsylvania. On March 5, 2019, his nomination was sent to the Senate. President Trump nominated Colville to the seat vacated by Judge Arthur J. Schwab, who assumed senior status on January 1, 2018. On May 9, 2019, his nomination was reported out of committee by a 15–7 vote. A cloture motion on the nomination was presented to the Senate on December 16, 2019, but it was withdrawn on December 18, 2019. On December 19, 2019, his nomination was confirmed by a 66–27 vote. He received his judicial commission on December 31, 2019.

References

External links 

1965 births
Living people
20th-century American lawyers
21st-century American judges
Duquesne University School of Law alumni
Judges of the Pennsylvania Courts of Common Pleas
Judges of the United States District Court for the Western District of Pennsylvania
Lawyers from Pittsburgh
Pennsylvania state court judges
Pennsylvania State University alumni
Politicians from Pittsburgh
United States district court judges appointed by Donald Trump